Motovilci ( or ; , Prekmurje Slovene: Motovöuci) is a village in the Municipality of Grad in the Prekmurje region of northeastern Slovenia.

References

External links
Motovilci on Geopedia

Populated places in the Municipality of Grad